The New York Foundation is a charitable foundation which gives grants to non-profit organizations supporting community organizing and advocacy in New York City.

History

1909–1919 

The New York Foundation was established in 1909 when Louis A. Heinsheimer, a partner in banking firm Kuhn, Loeb & Co., died.  In his will Heinsheimer bequeathed $1 million to "the Jewish charities of New York" under the condition that they choose to federate within a year of his death.

One year later when the conditions stiplated in Heinsheimer's will had not been met (the Federation of Jewish Philanthropies would not be founded until 1917) the $1 million bequest reverted into the hands of his brother, Alfred M. Heinsheimer, who, in turn, donated the money to the New York Foundation.

The New York Foundation was created by Edward Henderson, Jacob H. Schiff, Isaac Seligman, and Paul Warburg in order that they might "distribute... resources for altruistic purposes, charitable, benevolent, educational, or otherwise, within the United States of America".

The Foundation was officially incorporated in April 1909, when the charter drafted by Henderson, Schiff, Seligman, and Warburg was enacted by the New York State Legislature and signed by the Governor, making it one of the oldest organizations of its kind.

In an article published on November 5, 1910, the New York Times wrote an article about Alfred Heinsheimer's decision in which the Foundation's significance as a "non-sectarian" organization was emphasized.

That same year the Foundation gave a $4,100 grant to the Henry Street Settlement so that they might provide low-income families who were unable to afford "hospitals beds" with visiting nurse service.  This groundbreaking program led directly to the foundation of the Visiting Nurse Service of New York.

One year later, in 1911 the Foundation gave a grant to the Public Education Association so that they might establish a similar "visiting teacher"  service.

In 1912 The New York Prohibition Association received funds from the Foundation for a "protective league" for "girls... working in factories, offices, and shops".

Two grants were awarded to the National Association for the Advancement of Colored People, "a newly formed organization" whose Director of Publicity and Research, W. E. B. Du Bois had personally requested funding from the Foundation for "an investigation of the Negro Public Schools in the United States" as well as for the "Bureau of Legal Redress for Colored People".

The then-recently formed National Urban League also received a grant from the Foundation in that year.

In 1919 the Home for Hebrew Infants tested and proved the superiority of an alternative to institutionalized care by placing orphans with foster parents in private homes.  This program was made possible in part by funds from the Foundation.

1920–1949 

In 1925 Lionel J. Salomon bequeathed $2.4 million to the Foundation in his will.  He specified that the money go toward funding groups aiding children and elderly.

In 1929, ten years after his brother's death, Alfred M. Heimshiemer died, leaving the Foundation $6 million.

In 1930 the Foundation financed studies which "served to focus attention on serious yet previously ignored problems".  The Committee on the Costs of Medical Care surveyed the need for medical care in the United States while the Committee for Mental Hygiene analyzed state mental hospitals, then notorious for their "secrecy and ignorance".

In 1934 the Foundation funded a program which helped scholars forced out of Germany by Nazi persecution get jobs at leading American universities.

In 1935 $3,000 given by the New York Foundation to the New York City Bureau of Laboratories led to the development of a vaccine preventing infantile paralysis.

In 1939 the Medical Society of New York received funds from the Foundation in order that they might "experiment in voluntary prepaid medical care". The Foundation's president, David M. Heyman, chaired the mayoral committee which established the Health Insurance Plan of Greater New York, a model for prepaid health care systems to come.

Seeking to give grants to groups that might "correct the condition[s] which cause... social maladjustment", in the 1930s the Foundation was determined to "seek out neglected areas and tension points" where their resources would be most effective.

In 1930 the Foundation paid the salaries of "key staff members" of the Governor's Commission to Investigate Prison Administration and Construction, which created programs for the education and rehabilitation of state prison occupants.  Grants were made to both the city and state Department of Corrections, as well as the Social Service Bureau for Magistrate's Court, which provided counseling for criminals with "unfortunate social backgrounds".

In 1943 the New York Foundation cooperated with the Board of Education to produce what the New York Times called an "enriched school program" designed "to see whether juvenile delinquency and maladjustment can be reduced by a closer integration of school and community agencies".  18 teachers in 3 Harlem schools worked alongside "psychologists, psychiatrists, social workers and recreation counselors" to help over 5,000 elementary and junior high school students "receive special guidance" in the hopes of "correcting existing evils that have baffled school leaders for many years" as well as "promis[ing] future dividends in the way of better citizens".

In the aftermath of a series of race riots that occurred in Harlem in 1944, the Foundation helped fund the Mayor's Committee on Unity.

The Foundation celebrated its fortieth anniversary in 1949.  The New York Times commended the Foundation on its ability to take "risks... in fields that no other philanthropic organization cared to enter".  Calling the $8,000,000 given by the Foundation in its first four decades "an investment", the Times cited the "successful" Health Insurance Plan of Greater New York (H.I.P.) as an example of the Foundation's ability to produce "return[s] in social gain" and wrote "Probably no philanthropic organization ever received more for its money than the New York Foundation".

In another article published contemporaneously the Foundation is praised for "serving a function that governments themselves could not yet adequately perform" in particular because the Foundation "has shown great interest in the problems of minority groups".  The New York Times reported that at the time of the Foundation's fortieth anniversary their endowment was worth $11,000,000.

1950–1975 

In 1951 the Foundation funded research that led to the development of isoniazid, the first anti-tuberculosis drug.

In 1954 the Foundation's trustees began approving grants to groups focusing on the arts and recreation with support going to Lincoln Center's building fund—the original objective of which was to make the performing arts more affordable to a larger segment of the population.

The Foundation also began giving more grants to groups serving needy children, African-Americans, and the growing Puerto Rican population. ASPIRA, an organization committed to educating and training young Puerto Ricans so that they might achieve leadership roles in their community, was initially funded in part by grants from the New York Foundation.

In 1958, David M. Heyman was asked by Mayor Robert F. Wagner Jr. to head a commission studying the deterioration of municipal hospitals in the city.  This study, along with funding from the Foundation itself, led to the founding of the Task Force on the Organization of Medical Services.

Between 1958 and 1962 the New York Foundation gave more than $4,700,000 in grants.  40.4 percent of those grants were given as "'seed money' to stimulate research and expansion and modernization of existing medical school and hospital and nursing service programs.  The Foundation's President at the time, David M. Heyman, was quoted in the New York Times, saying "We are far from the day when private philanthropy can write off medicine as a piece of finished business... there is all too often a dismal gap between purse research and the practical application of it".

In the 1960s the Foundation had begun making grants outside of its "traditional" restriction of the five boroughs.  These included grants made to "selected civil rights efforts" in the Southern United States in the belief that "the struggle for civil rights in the South would have an enormous impact on the lives of the city's black citizens".

In 1963 the New York Foundation made a grant to Synanon, an "experimental, drug-free rehabilitation program" in California.  This was followed by grants given to similar "therapeutic communities" in and around New York City.

On the Foundation's fiftieth anniversary David M. Heyman was quoted in the New York Times saying "We have always felt that the Foundation should be a leader in sensing the trends of society, in helping develop the means of adjusting society to its new problems... The Foundation must probe, experiment and gamble on new social forms...  We try to be objective... We try to keep mobile and not committed for too long a time..."

Between 1956 and 1957, the Foundation gave over $2,000,000 in grants to 140 institutions.  The New York Times reported that these grants were "the largest for any comparable period since the Foundation was organized in 1909".  More than $1,000,000 went to "agencies concerned with public health and medicine", more than $500,000 went to "social welfare groups", and almost $400,000 went to groups supporting "the advancement of education and the arts".  President David M. Heyman said that the Foundation's goal was "to identify new areas of need and... put financial resources to work on those particularly pressing problems whose solutions would promise the greatest good".  He noted that the Foundation's strength lay in its ability to "withdraw from a field as rapidly as it entered" and that the Foundation was "relying on a ready public response to carry a good work forward on its own".

Among the grants awarded to medical institutions, the New York Times reported that over $500,000 in grants had been made toward mental health programs, over $100,000 toward medical research groups studying "eye surgery, the deaf, protein structure, and the effects of radiation on genetics", and over $140,000 toward medical and nursing education, including one group supporting the "re-education of foreign physicians [unable] to meet state examinations".
A $50,000 grant to the Hospital Research and Education Trust received special attention in the press.  The New York Times wrote that the program "promises the first important break-through in decades in reducing mounting costs of hospital care... for the chronically-disabled".

By 1968 the Foundation was again focused on addressing the economic, housing, and educational needs of local communities in New York City.  Grants made funded everything from a study of lead poisoning among children in the South Bronx to a program of financial assistance for students from disadvantaged urban areas and from fuel cooperatives for tenant-managed buildings to the advanced training of minority personnel in various professions.

At the same time, funding was given to support national programs whose work "affected problems of concern at the local level", such as the National Council on Hunger and Malnutrition and the National Committee Against Discrimination in Housing.

In 1969 the impending decentralization of the public school system led the Foundation to give grants to the Public Education Association as well as the New York Lawyers' Committee for Civil Rights Under Law, which educated lawyers on the relevant legislation.

In addition grants were made to several experimental programs in the public school system, including three "innovative" community schools: East Harlem Block School, the Children's Community Workshop School, and the Lower East Side Action Project.

In the 1970s the Foundation began making grants to "organizations concerned with affordable housing the revitalization of low-income neighborhoods".  These included the West Harlem Community Organization, East Harlem Interfaith, the Upper Park Avenue Community Association, United Neighborhood Houses, and other programs committed to management training, tenant organizing, and housing rehabilitation services.

In 1973 a $10,000 grant from the New York Foundation went to the founding of the Hunter College Institute for Trial Judges, which the New York Times described as "a forum for the discussion of the courts and social change [that is] the first of its kind in the country". 30 New York judges, along with several prominent social scientists conducted a series of seminars and discussion groups.  The institute's founder, Dr. Blanche D. Blank, was quoted in the Times, saying "We would like to make available to trial judges the insights and finding of current scholarship and, at the same time, bring to the academic world some of the special knowledge and experience of the bench".

1975–2010 

In 1975 New York City's fiscal crisis began.  In that year the Foundation Board's Planning Committee reviewed and revised the policies of the foundation, reemphasizing the foundation's role as an "innovator, as the provider of seed money to new programs that would eventually be picked up by more traditional funding sources" while choosing to "no longer consider grants in the arts or medicine".  In the wake of the "devastating impact that the financial crisis [had] on the City's already ravaged neighborhoods" the Foundation "redoubled its efforts" and commitment to "the young and the aged, the poor and minorities" as well as "people and groups working to improve their own communities".  Grants were given to several neighborhood preservation groups including the Pratt Institute Center for Community and Environmental Development and the Association of Neighborhood Housing Developers.

In 1976 the New York Times listed the Foundation as one of the largest funders of the city's Bicentennial Old New York Festival.

In 1978 the New York Foundation once again began making start-up grant to "new untested programs... involving a high element of risk".

By 1984 the New York Foundation had distributed close to $44 million to an extraordinary variety of people and organizations.  Challenging the status quo of the times, the Foundation was "willing to take calculated risks to assess local resources and mobilize and deliver them at the neighborhood level".

During the 1980s the Foundation's grantees included crisis intervention programs run by youth for youth, advocacy services for welfare recipients, and training classes for surrogate grandmothers working with disadvantaged mothers and their children.  As always the Foundation was "guided by the belief that community residents had the will if not the means to make a difference in their own lives".

Today the New York Foundation is known as "a preeminent funder of grassroots groups".  Since its founding the New York Foundation has given over $133 million to "a wide range of people and groups working in extraordinary circumstances.  At the time of their 100th Anniversary celebration in 2009, more than half of the foundation's grants went to community organizing groups.

Notable trustees

Notable grantees by year

1910s 

 1910: Henry Street Settlement
 1910: Neurological Institute of New York
 1911: Hebrew Sheltering and Immigrant Aid Society (HIAS)
 1911: National Association for the Advancement of Colored People
 1911: Travelers' Aid Society
 1912: New York Heart Association
 1912: Urban League
 1913: Teachers College, Columbia University
 1916: New York Infirmary Indigent for Women and Children

1920s 

 1920: Mount Sinai Hospital
 1921: National Tuberculosis Association
 1922: Peabody College for Teachers
 1922: Tuskegee Normal and Industrial Institute
 1923: Fisk University
 1927: Howard University

1930s 

 1931: Frontier Nursing Service
 1932: American Public Health Association
 1932: Little Red School House
 1933: American Friends Service Committee
 1933: American Hospital Association
 1933: Maternity Center Association
 1935: New York City Department of Hospitals
 1939: University in Exile

1940s 

 1940: New York University Medical College
 1940: Institute of the Pennsylvania Hospital
 1940: New York Academy of Medicine
 1940: Harvard Medical School
 1941: American Prison Association
 1943: Menninger Foundation
 1943: Goodwill Industries
 1944: Visiting Nurse Service of New York
 1944: Health Insurance Plan of Greater New York
 1944: University of Michigan School of Public Health
 1944: Sydenham Hospital
 1944: United Negro College Fund
 1945: American Cancer Society
 1945: American Psychiatric Association
 1945: Harvard University Law School
 1946: Rusk Institute
 1946: New York State Psychiatric Institute
 1947: Knickerbocker Hospital
 1949: New York City Department of Health
 1949: American Academy of Pediatrics

1950s 

 1950: National Association for Mental Health
 1950: New York Academy of Medicine
 1953:  Memorial Center for Cancer and Allied Diseases
 1954: Polytechnic Institute of New York University
 1954:  Institute of Public Administration
 1954: Fountain House
 1955: National Association for Retarded Children
 1957: Clarke School for the Deaf
 1957: Cooper Union
 1958: Lenox Hill Hospital
 1958: Southern Regional Council
 1959: Hamilton-Madison House

1960s 

 1961: ASPIRA
 1963: American Diabetes Association
 1963: Manhattan Eye, Ear and Throat Hospital
 1965: Accion International
 1965: Operation Crossroads Africa
 1966: Congress of Racial Equality
 1966: Maimonides Medical Center
 1966: Blythedale Children's Hospital
 1967: Hunter College
 1967: Judson Health Center
 1967: American Social Health Association
 1967: Southern Regional Council
 1968: Legal Aid Society
 1968: National Welfare Rights Organization
 1968: Southern Student Organizing Committee
 1969: Center for Community Change

1970s 

 1971: Harlem School of the Arts
 1971: Jazzmobile
 1972: Floating Foundation of Photography
 1972: Pratt Institute
 1973: Lawyers' Committee for Civil Rights Under Law
 1973: University of Pittsburgh
 1973: Voter Education Project
 1974: Center for Constitutional Rights
 1974: INFORM, Inc.
 1974: United Presbyterian Church in the USA
 1975: Tougaloo College
 1976: Asian American Legal Defense and Education Fund
 1976: Urban Academy Laboratory High School
 1977: New York Civil Liberties Union
 1979: National Women's Health Network
 1979: New Ballet School

1980s 

 1980: St. Luke's-Roosevelt Hospital Center
 1981: New York University Medical Center
 1981: Outward Bound USA
 1981: Teachers and Writers Collaborative
 1984: Albert Einstein College of Medicine
 1985: Community Healthcare Network
 1986: 92nd Street Y
 1986: Lutheran Medical Center
 1989: New York AIDS Coalition
 1989: Medicare Rights Center

1990s 

 1992: Chinese Staff and Workers' Association
 1992: United Community Centers
 1997: Brown University
 1997: Legal Information for Families Today
 1999: Audre Lorde Project
 1999: Ella Baker Center for Human Rights

2000s 

 2001: Sustainable South Bronx
 2005: Sikh Coalition
 2005: Sylvia Rivera Law Project
 2006: New York Civil Liberties Union
 2007: Esperanza del Barrio
 2007: New York Lawyers for the Public Interest
 2008: Movement for Justice in el Barrio
 2008: Picture the Homeless
 2009: Brandworkers International

In the Media 
 "Small, Focused New York Foundation Should Serve as Grant-Making Model", Chronicle of Philanthropy Sept. 19, 2010

References

External links 
 
 New York Foundation records, 1909–2009 Manuscripts and Archives, New York Public Library.

Non-profit organizations based in New York City
Community foundations based in the United States
Organizations established in 1909
1909 establishments in New York City
Loeb family